Comet 4P/Faye (also known as Faye's Comet or Comet Faye) is a periodic Jupiter-family comet discovered in November 1843 by Hervé Faye at the Royal Observatory in Paris.  Its most recent perihelia (closest approaches to the Sun) were on November 15, 2006; May 29, 2014; and September 8, 2021.

The comet was first observed by Faye on November 23, but bad weather prevented its confirmation until the 25th.  It was so faint that it had already passed perihelion about a month before its discovery, and only a close pass by the Earth had made it bright enough for discovery.  Otto Wilhelm von Struve reported that the comet was visible to the naked eye at the end of November.  It remained visible for smaller telescopes until January 10, 1844, and was finally lost to larger telescopes on April 10, 1844.

In 1844, Friedrich Wilhelm Argelander and Thomas James Henderson independently computed that the comet was a short-period comet; by May, its period had been calculated to be 7.43 years.  Urbain Le Verrier computed the positions for the 1851 apparition, predicting perihelion in April 1851.  The comet was found close to his predicted position on November 29, 1850, by James Challis.

The comet was missed during its apparitions in 1903 and 1918 due to unfavorable observing circumstances.  It reached a brightness of about 9th magnitude in 2006.

4P/Faye has a close approach to Jupiter every 59.3 years, which is gradually reducing its perihelion and increasing its orbital eccentricity.  In the most recent close approach to Jupiter (March 2018), Faye's perihelion changed from about 1.7 AU to about 1.5 AU.

The comet is estimated to be about 3.5 km in diameter.

References

External links 

 Orbital simulation from JPL (Java) / Horizons Ephemeris
 4P/Faye at CometBase database
 4P/Faye – Seiichi Yoshida @ aerith.net
 4P/Faye history from Gary W. Kronk's Cometography
 4P/Faye at the Minor Planet Center's Database

Periodic comets
0004
Comets in 2014
20210908
18431123